The 1898 Purdue Boilermakers football team was an American football team that represented Purdue University during the 1898 Western Conference football season. The Boilermakers compiled a 3–3 record and outscored their opponents by a total of 37 to 33 in their first season under head coach Alpha Jamison. R. L. Spears was the team captain.

Schedule

References

Purdue
Purdue Boilermakers football seasons
Purdue Boilermakers football